The Thunderthief is John Paul Jones's second solo studio album.

Track listing 

All music and lyrics composed and written by John Paul Jones, except where otherwise noted.

 "Leafy Meadows" – 5:10
 "The Thunderthief" (Jones, Peter Blegvad) – 5:58
 "Hoediddle" – 7:00
 "Ice Fishing at Night" (Jones, Blegvad) – 4:31
 "Daphne" – 4:50
 "Angry Angry" – 5:54 
 "Down to the River to Pray" (Traditional; arranged by Jones) – 4:17
 "Shibuya Bop" – 5:56
 "Freedom Song" – 2:37

Personnel 

 John Paul Jones – vocals, 4, 6, 10, and 12-string bass guitars, bass steel guitar, acoustic and electric guitars, mandolin, electric mandolin, piano, organ, synthesizers, Kyma, koto, autoharp, ukulele, harmonica
 Terl Bryant – drums, percussion, toforan
 Nick Beggs – Chapman Stick on "Shibuya Bop" and "Leafy Meadows"
 Adam Bomb – guitar solo on "Angry Angry"
 Robert Fripp – guitar solo on "Leafy Meadows"

References 

2001 albums
John Paul Jones (musician) albums
Progressive rock albums by British artists
Instrumental rock albums
Heavy metal albums by English artists
Punk rock albums by British artists
Discipline Global Mobile albums